The South Dakota House of Representatives is the lower house of the South Dakota Legislature. It consists of 70 members, two from each legislative district. Two of the state's 35 legislative districts, Districts 26 and 28, are each subdivided into two single-member districts (26A/26B and 28A/28B). The South Dakota House of Representatives meets at the South Dakota State Capitol in Pierre.

Composition

92nd Legislature (2019)

Leadership

Members of the House for the 2023 Legislative Session

Past composition of the House of Representatives

See also
South Dakota Senate

References

Pierre, South Dakota
State lower houses in the United States
South Dakota Legislature